Marcel Wüst (born 6 August 1967) is a German former road bicycle racer. He won stages in all of the three Grand Tours; twelve stages in the Vuelta a España, one stage in the Tour de France and a stage in the Giro d'Italia.

In 2000, a crash left him without sight in one eye and prematurely ended his professional career. In 2002 and 2003, Wüst worked as a team manager for Team Coast. He also had a career as an analyst in broadcasting until 2008.

Early life and family
Wüst was born in Cologne. He got his first taste for cycling when his family visited the 1973 Tour de France during vacation in France. He received his first racing bike at the age of ten, in 1977, before joining the local cycling club a year later. In 1984, Wüst won the opening stage of a stage race in Luxembourg. Three years later, he and fellow Cologne-based cyclist Heike Gasel became a couple. They married in January 1990. The two have a son, Alexander, who was born in 1998. Wüst spends three months a year in his elected second home, Noosa, Australia, while remaining a resident of his native Cologne.

Cycling career
In mid-1988, Wüst turned professional with the French RMO team, taking part in that year's edition of Paris–Tours, where he won the first intermediate sprint. His first victory in the professional field came at the Ronde des Pyrenees in 1989. In 1990, he won three races and took part in his first Grand Tour, the Giro d'Italia. The following year, he started the Vuelta a España, but was forced to retire with intestinal problems after having held the point leader's jersey for a while. In 1992, he rode his first Tour de France, but retired with a broken collarbone on the first stage in San Sebastián. This gave him the unfortunate honour of being the first rider in the history of the race not to reach French soil.

For 1993, Wüst moved to the French team Novemail–Histor. Disillusioned with the lack of professionalism in the squad, he left for the Le Groupement team in 1995, only for the team to fold for financial reasons. He switched over to the Spanish Castellblanch team and started in the Vuelta a España, where he won three stages. He remained with the team for 1996, winning a stage in the Volta a Catalunya and two in the Tour DuPont. However, differences of opinion with the team's management led to Wüst signing with Festina for 1997.

With his new team, he won a stage at the 1997 Giro d'Italia and three stages of the 1997 Vuelta a España. A year later, with the team still embroiled in the Festina affair, Wüst again took two stage wins during that year's Vuelta a España. He was set to compete in the 1999 Tour de France, but a broken collarbone in a pre-Tour criterium race ruled him out. Instead, he once more started the Vuelta a España, this time taking four stage wins.

Even with his frequent victories, Wüst remained largely anonymous in his native Germany because he was riding for foreign squads as opposed to the popular Team Telekom. He moved into the public eye in 2000, when he started his second-ever Tour de France. The race began with an individual time trial at Futuroscope, which included a categorized climb. Wüst chose to go specifically for the point available for the fastest up the climb and managed to pull over the polka-dot jersey for the best climber at the end of the day, wearing it for the first days of the Tour. On stage five, he beat out his sprinting rivals to take the victory at Vitré. He eventually abandoned the Tour nine stages from the finish in Paris due to a bronchitis.

After the Tour, on 11 August 2000, Wüst took part in the Criterium d'Issoire to prepare for the upcoming Vuelta a España. Upon impact, he hit a sharp object, presumably the foot of a road barrier, head-on. He suffered severe injuries to his head, especially his right eye socket. He was treated in a clinic in Clermont-Ferrand and was soon out of mortal danger, but lost sight in his right eye. His team honoured his existing contract into 2001, but with his vision severely impaired, Wüst decided to retire from professional cycling.

Doping allegations
Following the Festina affair, which uncovered widespread use of doping on his team, Wüst was rumoured to have been using performance-enhancing drugs as well. He repeatedly denied these accusations. However, when Willy Voet, the team's soigneur, released a book about the affair in 1999, printed diary entries suggested that Wüst had injected erythropoietin (EPO) six times in January and February 1997. In his defence, Wüst pointed to his hematocrit level from mid-January of that year, which showed a level of 43.3, well below values usually considered an indication of EPO use.

Post-cycling career
After his retirement, Wüst joined Team Coast as a directeur sportif. When the team folded in mid-2003 for financial problems after the signing of Jan Ullrich, he did not join the subsequent Team Bianchi, founded from the remainders of Coast. He worked as an analyst during cycling coverage for German TV station ARD. In this position, he was fired by ARD in 2007, after the broadcaster decided not to use former cyclists in their coverage in the wake of doping revelations at the Telekom team. He returned in 2008, but ARD decided not to continue its broadcast of the Tour de France after that year. On 1 April 2017, Wüst was elected into the office of vice-president, responsible for marketing and communication, of the Bund Deutscher Radfahrer, the German cycling federation.

Major results
Sources:

1986
 1st  National Junior Road race Championship
1988
 1st Grand Prix de Waregem
 1st Stage 3 Tour du Loir et Cher Am
 1st Stage 7 Giro della Valle d'Aosta
 8th GP de la Ville de Rennes
1989
 1st Tour de Midi-Pyrénées
 1st Stage 3a Tour de Picardie
 1st Stage 4b Circuit de la Sarthe
 3rd Brussels Cycling Classic
 4th Cholet-Pays de la Loire
 8th Paris–Tours
 8th (TTT) Grand Prix de la Libération
 10th Overall Route Adélie
1990
 1st Stage 2 Circuit de la Sarthe
 1st Stage 2b Paris–Bourges
 1st Stage 6 (ITT) Vuelta a Burgos
1991
 1st Stages 1 & 3 La Route du Sud
 1st Stage 3 Tour Poitou-Charentes en Nouvelle-Aquitaine
 Herald Sun Tour
1st  Sprint classification
1st Stages 1, 11 & 14 
 1st Stages 6 & 8 Audax Alpine Classic
 5th E3 Prijs Vlaanderen
 5th Rund um Köln
 6th Kuurne–Brussels–Kuurne
1992
 1st Stages 1, 3, 4 & 6 La Route du Sud
 1st Stage 5 Grand Prix du Midi Libre
 1st Stages 4a, 6a & 10 Herald Sun Tour
 1st Stages 1, 5 & 8 Audax Alpine Classic
 1st  Points classification Classic Brugge–De Panne
 2nd Grand Prix du Morbihan
 6th Grand Prix de Denain
 10th Overall Tour de l'Avenir
1st  Points classification
1st Stage 1
 10th Dwars door België
1993
 1st Grand Prix de Denain
 1st Grand Prix de Plumelec-Morbihan
 1st Stage 2 Volta a Catalunya
 1st Stage 2 Vuelta a Burgos
 Herald Sun Tour
1st  Mountain classification
1st  Points classification
1st Stages 3 & 7b 
 1st  Sprint classification Vuelta a Murcia
 2nd Binche–Chimay–Binche
 3rd Rund um Köln
 5th Paris–Camembert
 7th Tour de Vendée
1994
 1st Stage 1 Critérium du Dauphiné Libéré
 1st  Sprint classification Vuelta a Murcia
 3rd Overall Herald Sun Tour
1st  Points classification
1st Stage 1
1995
 1st Stages 4, 14, 21 Vuelta a España
 1st Stage 2 Quatre Jours de l'Aisne
 1st Stage 6 Clásico RCN
 Herald Sun Tour
1st  Mountain classification
 1st Stage 7 
1996
 1st Stages 3a & 11 Tour DuPont
 1st Stage 4 Vuelta a Castilla y León
 Volta a Catalunya
1st  Points classification
1st Stage 7
 Vuelta Ciclista a La Rioja
1st  Points classification
1st  Sprints classification
1st Stages 1a & 3 
1997
 1st Stages 2, 3 & 5 Vuelta a España
 1st Stage 7 Giro d'Italia
 1st Stage 4 La Route du Sud
 Vuelta a Burgos
1st  Points classification
1st Stage 5 
 7th Hennesee Rundfahrt
 8th Grand Prix de Denain
 10th Vuelta a Mallorca
1998
 1st Stages 14 & 17 Vuelta a España
 1st Stage 2 Circuit de la Sarthe
 1st Stage 3 Vuelta a Burgos
 1st Circuito de Getxo
 3rd Overall Vuelta Ciclista de Chile
1st Stages 1, 6, 7, 8, 10 & 11
 4th Clásica de Almería
1999
 Vuelta a España
1st Stages 2, 3, 4 & 7 
Held  After stages 3 & 4
Held  After stages 3–16
 1st Stage 1 Setmana Catalana de Ciclisme
 Vuelta a Aragón
1st  Points classification
1st Stages 2 & 5 
 1st Stage 4 Tour of Galicia
 1st Stage 5 Vuelta a Burgos
 1st Stages 10 & 14 Commonwealth Classic
 5th Trofeo Luis Puig
2000
 1st Stage 5 Tour de France
 1st Stages 1, 2, 3, 5 Circuit de la Sarthe
 1st Stage 6 Deutschland Tour
 1st Stage 1 Vuelta a Aragón
 2nd Grand Prix de Rennes
 5th Trofeo Palma
 9th Philadelphia International Cycling Classic

Grand Tour results timeline

References

External links

Book Review: Marcel Wüst – Sprinter Years

1967 births
German male cyclists
Living people
German Tour de France stage winners
German Vuelta a España stage winners
German Giro d'Italia stage winners
Cyclists from Cologne
Vuelta Ciclista de Chile stage winners